Babette is a Broadway operetta with a libretto by Harry B. Smith and music by Victor Herbert, which premiered in 1903.

Productions 
The original production opened at the Broadway Theatre on November 16, 1903, and closed on January 9, 1904, after 59 performances.

In 1976 Bel Canto Opera staged an off-Broadway revival of the show, which opened on May 21 and ran for four performances.

Synopsis 
Babette, the letter-writer of a small Flemish village, travels with a group of Flemish patriots to Versailles to seek help from the French king in their desire for freedom from the Spanish.

Songs

Act l 
 Opening Chorus (Ensemble)
 My Honor and My Sword (Mondragon and Chorus)
 On the Other Side of The Wall (Mondragon and Vinetta)
 Entrance of Babette (Ensemble)
 Letter I Write all day (Letter-writing Song) (Babette)
 He Who’d Thrive (Clockmaker’s Song) (Van Tympel and Chorus)
 I’ll Bribe the Stars (Picture Painting Song) (Babette and Marcel)
 Finale I (Ensemble)

Act ll 
 Opening Chorus Act II (Ensemble)
 Tony the Peddler (Mondragon and Chorus)
 Hear the Coachman Crack His Whip (Ensemble)
 We're Very Highly Polished at the Court (Baltazar and Vinetta)
 To the Sound of the Pipe and the Roll of the Drum (Babette, Vinetta, Eva and Chorus)
 On The Stage (Van Tymple)
 Be Kind to poor Pierrot (Babette)
 There once was an owl (Marcel, Vinetta, Eva, Mondragon, Katrina, Theresa)
 My Lady ‘Tis For Thee (Marcel)
 The Life of a Bold Free Lance (Captain Guzman and Chorus)
 Finale II (Ensemble)

Act lll 

 Opening Chorus Act III (Ensemble)
 It’s A way we have in Spain (Van Tromp, Eva, Mondragon, Marcel and Chorus)
 My Lady of the Manor (Vinette, Eva, Marcel and Mondragon)
 Where the Fairest Flow’rs (Butterfly Waltz) (Babette)
 Finale III (Ensemble)

Cast

Reception 
The 1903 production received positive reviews for Scheff in the lead role and Herbert's music, but generally negative reviews for the show's book.

External links 
 Babette at the IBDB

References 

1903 operas
1903 musicals
Broadway musicals
Off-Broadway musicals
Plays set in Belgium
Plays set in France